The World Judo Championships are the highest level of international judo competition, along with the Olympic judo competition. The championships are held once every year (except the years when the Olympics take place) by the International Judo Federation, and qualified judoka compete in their respective categories as representatives of their home countries. Team competitions have also been held since 1994. The men's championships began in 1956, though the format and periodicity of the championships have changed over time. The last edition of the championships took place in Tashkent, Uzbekistan in 2022.

History

The first edition of the world championships took place in Tokyo, Japan in 1956. There were no weight classes at the time and Japanese judoka Shokichi Natsui became the first world champion in history, defeating fellow countryman Yoshihiko Yoshimatsu in the final. The second world championship was also held in Tokyo two years later, with the Japanese winning the top two spots in the competition for the second time. In 1961, the championship was held outside Japan for the first time, and Dutch judoka Anton Geesink defeated the prior world champion, Koji Sone, in Paris, France, to become the first non-Japanese world champion.

The 1965 World Judo Championships were held in Rio de Janeiro, Brazil, and weight classes were implemented for the first time with the addition of the −68 kg, −80 kg, and +80 kg categories. Judo had become an Olympic sport at the 1964 Summer Olympics held in Tokyo, and a permanent sport after a brief absence at the 1968 Summer Olympics.

Despite this progressive enlargement, it took until 1980 for women to participate in the world championships. The first women's world championships were held in New York City in 1980, and were held in alternating years as the men's championships until the 1987 World Judo Championships in Essen, where the two competitions were merged into one world championship. The mixed championships have been held biannually since 1987. In 2005, the world championships made its debut on the African continent in Cairo, Egypt. In the International Judo Federation meeting held in Rio de Janeiro, Brazil in 2007 (during the 2007 World Judo Championships), it was decided that France would host the world championships for the fifth time in 2011.

Weight classes
There are currently 16 tournaments in the world championships, with 8 weight classes for each gender.

Competitions by year
The world championships have been held in every continent except Oceania and Antarctica.

Men's competitions

Women's competitions

Mixed competitions

Openweight competitions

Medal tables

Men's medal count – individual events (1956–2022)

Women's medal count – individual events (1980–2022)

Total medal count – individual events (1956–2022)

World Team Judo Championships
The first World Team Judo Championships was held in 1994 as separate event and only for men's national teams. The first World Team Judo Championships for women's national team was held as separate event in 1997. Since 1998, World Team Judo Championships for men's and women's national teams have been held at the same time and venue. It were held every four years until 2006 (although promotional team events were held during 2003 and 2005 World Judo Championships) and every year from 2007 to 2015 (except 2009). Since 2011 men's and women's team competitions became the part of World Judo Championships. Starting from 2017, it were merged into mixed team competition. Judokas who participates in the individual events at the World Championships often do not participate in the team competition.

World Team Judo Championships — Mixed team

Medal tables
The results of promotional team events which were held during 2003 and 2005 World Judo Championships are not included into overall statistics.

Men's medal count – team events (1994–2015)

Total medal count – team events (1994–2022)

Women's medal count – team events (1997–2015)

Mixed medal count – team events (2017–2022)

All-time medal count
List of World Judo Championships medalists

Updated after the 2022 World Judo Championships.

This table include all medals in the individual and team competitions won at the World Judo Championships as well as at the separate World Team Judo Championships and separate World Judo Open Championships.

a Unlike in 2013, Majlinda Kelmendi did not compete at the 2014 World Judo Championships under the Kosovo flag but under the International Judo Federation flag, as Russia does not recognise Kosovo's independence. 
b At the 2018 World Championships, judokas from North Korea and South Korea completed for unified Korean team and won bronze medals in the Mixed team competition.
c At the 2021 World Championships, in accordance with a ban by the World Anti-Doping Agency (WADA) and a decision by the Court of Arbitration for Sport (CAS), judokas from Russia were not permitted to use the Russian name, flag, or anthem. They instead participated as "the team of the Russian Judo Federation (RJF)", and used the flag of the Russian Olympic Committee.

Multiple gold medalists
Boldface denotes active judokas and highest medal count among all judokas (including these who not included in these tables) per type.

Men

Individual events

All events

# including one medal of the World Team Championships won as reserve
* including one medal of the World Team Championships won for participation in the qualifying only
** including two medals of the World Team Championships won for participation in the qualifying only
*## including one medal of the World Team Championships won for participation in the qualifying only and two won as reserve
*** including three medals of the World Team Championships won for participation in the qualifying only

Women

Individual events

All events

# including one medal of the World Team Championships won as reserve
* including one medal of the World Team Championships won for participation in the qualifying only
*# including one medal of the World Team Championships won for participation in the qualifying only and one won as reserve
**# including two medals of the World Team Championships won for participation in the qualifying only and one won as reserve

Records

Video footage
World Championship 2013 in Rio de Janeiro
World Championships 2012 in Salvador
World Championships 2011 in Paris
World Championships 2010 in Tokyo
World Championships 2009 in Rotterdam
World Championships 2007 in Rio de Janeiro
World Championships 2005 in Cairo
World Championships 2003 in Osaka
World Championships 2001 in Munich
World Championships 1999 in Birmingham
World Championships 1997 in Paris
World Championships 1995 in Chiba
World Championships 1993 in Hamilton
World Championships 1991 in Barcelona
World Championships 1989 in Belgrade
World Championships 1987 in Essen
World Championships 1985 in Seoul
World Championships 1983 in Moscow
World Championships 1981 in Maastricht
World Championships 1980 in New York
World Championships 1979 in Paris
World Championships 1961 in Paris
World Championships 1956 in Tokyo

References

External links

Judo Union
European Judo Union
Judoinside
Judobase

 
World Championships
World Championships
Judo
Recurring sporting events established in 1956